Shoghakat is a village in the Shoghakat Municipality of the Gegharkunik Province of Armenia, located near Lake Sevan, northwest of the Artanish Peninsula. The village was founded in the 1810s by Mordvins exiled from Russia. At the beginning of the 20th century Turks settled in the village. In 1988-1989 Armenian refugees from Azerbaijan settled in the village.

Toponymy 
The village was formerly known as Nadezhdino, Shordzhalu and later Shorzha until November 2017.

Historical sites 

A 17th-century chapel and cemetery are located along the southern outskirts of the village.  On the hill overlooking Shoghakat, there are the ruins of another chapel. Remains of an Iron Age fort can be seen in same area.

Nature 

The Artanish peninsula of Lake Sevan with a hill of the same name, is located close to the village. Sea-buckthorn (Hippophae) with wild-growing edible sour berries grow at the shores of Lake Sevan. Planted after the lowering of the level of Lake Sevan in the Soviet period. The vicinity of the village hosts 111 species of butterflies and is recognized as the Prime Butterfly Area "Artanish-Shoghakat". Also the area is known as one of the key birding sites of Armenia.

Infrastructure 
The village can be accessed via Armenian road M14 (repaired in 2020-21) running along the north-east shore of Lake Sevan either from Tsovagyugh village (in the northwest of Shoghakat) or from Vardenis (in the south-east).  Another road connects it to the town of Chambarak in the north-west. In summer, passenger trains of South Caucasus Railways commute from Yerevan, via the towns of Hrazdan and Sevan.

Recreation 

The shores of Lake Sevan near the village hosts several popular camping sites. Most popular is perhaps the camping site called "Whishup" (a wordplay with Vishap, "dragon" in Armenian) located between the road and lakeshore at about 1.5 km from the village towards Tsovagyugh. Various water sports, like wakeboarding, kiteboarding, are practiced there and some equipment is available for rent along a sandy beach with a cafe. In summer evenings concerts are held at the stage on the beach. On the opposite side of the Artanish peninsula, the yachting clubs "Ayas" and "Armenian camp" can be found. Sailing and paddling equipment can be rented there and guided tours on a sailing ship can be booked.

A copy of a medieval Armenian sea vessel is placed there. Built in the 90's and named Cilicia (referring to Armenian Kingdom of Cilicia, where such vessels were built and used) it sailed round Europe, and was brought back to Lake Sevan. There is also a diver's club located nearby.

Municipal administration 
After administrative reforms in November 2017, the name of the village was changed from Shorzha to Shoghakat and it was assigned as the administrative centre of the same-name rural municipality including the villages of Aghberk, Artanish, Drakhtik, Jil and Tsapatagh.

Gallery

References

External links

 
 

Populated places in Gegharkunik Province
Erivan Governorate